The 1988–89 Wessex Football League was the third season of the Wessex Football League. The league champions for the third consecutive season were Bashley, who were subsequently promoted to the Southern League.

For sponsorship reasons, the league was known as the Medisport Wessex League.

League table
The league consisted of one division of 17 clubs, reduced from 19 the previous season after the merger between Wellworthy Athletic and Lymington to form AFC Lymington, and Steyning Town joined the Combined Counties League. One new club joined, being the newly formed merged club:
AFC Lymington

References

Wessex Football League seasons
9